Chaetarthriinae is a subfamily in the family Hydrophilidae of aquatic beetles, and it contains 92 species in 8 genera .

Classification
The subfamily contains two tribes:

 Chaetharthriini constituted by the genera:
 Apurebium García, 2002
 Chaetharthria Stephens, 1835
 Guyanobius Spangler, 1986 
 Hemisphaera Pandellé, 1876 
 Thysanarthria d'Orchymont, 1926 
 Venezuelobium García, 2002

 Anacaenini (including former Horelophinae)
 Anacaena Thomson, 1859 
 Crenitis Bedel, 1881
 Horelophus d'Orchymont, 1913 
 Notohydrus Balfour-Browne, 1939
 Phelea Hansen, 1999

References

Polyphaga subfamilies
Hydrophilidae